Bill Summers may refer to:

Bill Summers (car builder) (1935–2011), American car builder and longtime speed record holder
Bill Summers (musician) (born 1948), American jazz percussionist
Bill Summers (umpire) (1895–1966), American umpire
Billy Summers, a 2021 novel by Stephen King

See also
 William Summers (disambiguation)